"The Answer" is a song by British recording artist Example. It was released as a single on 19 January 2018. The song was written and produced by Example himself with the collaboration of Raoul "Diztortion" Chen and was included in BBC Radio 1's "New Music Friday" playlist.

Background
The song is taken from his upcoming sixth studio album, which he describes as "a collection of songs I want to still be performing ten years from now". He has already written 50 songs for the project, and as of January 2018, Example had the album finished for over a year and is waiting for his label to allow him to put it out.

Music video
The music video, directed by Dominic O'Riordan and produced by Hannah Bilverstone, was premiered the same day the song was released, on 19 January 2018.

Live performances
Example performed the song on The Last Leg on 16 February 2018.

Track listing
Digital download
The Answer - 3:09

Brunelle remix
The Answer (Brunelle remix) - 2:42

James Hype remix
The Answer (James Hype remix) - 3:10

Sevaqk remix featuring Wretch 32 & Cadet
The Answer (Sevaqk remix featuring Wretch 32 & Cadet) - 3:01

 Acoustic version featuring Hayla
The Answer (acoustic version featuring Hayla) - 2:51

Release history

References

2018 songs
2018 singles
Example (musician) songs
Epic Records singles
Songs written by Example (musician)
Songs written by Diztortion